is a Japanese football player. He plays as an attacking midfielder for Sagan Tosu.

Club career
Born in Yokosuka, next to a satellite city of Yokohama. Ono joined Yokohama F. Marinos youth academy at age 13. He was a member of the Yokohama F. Marinos youth team that won the Prince Takamado Cup in 2009 beating Júbilo Iwata. Ono made his competitive debut in a J1 League match against Sanfrecce Hiroshima at Hiroshima Big Arch on July 18, 2010, as a 62nd-minute substitute for Shingo Hyodo. At 17 years and 208 days, he was club's youngest-ever league debutante, a record previously held by Kota Mizunuma (17 years and 247 days). Two months later, on September 5, 2009, Ono scored his first goal in a 3–1 victory against V-Varen Nagasaki in the Emperor's Cup. In January 2011, he signed a new long term contract with Marinos.

On July 20, 2015, Ono signed a contract with Sint-Truiden.

International career
In February 2011, Ono was called up to the Japan national under-23 football team, or the "U-22 team". He earned his first cap for the Japan U-22's against Bahrain U-22's on February 12, 2011.

Personal life 
Yuji's older brother, Yuto Ono, is also a footballer who currently plays as a midfielder for J2 League club FC Gifu.

Club statistics
Updated to February 24, 2019.

1Includes Emperor's Cup and Belgian Cup.
2Includes J.League Cup.

References

External links
Profile at Sagan Tosu

1992 births
Living people
Association football people from Kanagawa Prefecture
Japanese footballers
J1 League players
Belgian Pro League players
Yokohama F. Marinos players
Sagan Tosu players
Gamba Osaka players
Standard Liège players
Sint-Truidense V.V. players
Japanese expatriate footballers
Expatriate footballers in Belgium
Japanese expatriate sportspeople in Belgium
Association football forwards